John Michael Nonna (born July 8, 1948) is an American fencer and attorney. He currently serves as the Westchester County Attorney.

Biography
Nonna was born on July 8, 1948. He attended Regis High School in Manhattan, graduating in 1966. Nonna received his bachelor's degree from Princeton University in 1970.

He competed in the individual and team foil events at the 1972 Summer Olympics. Nonna also qualified for the 1980 Olympic team but did not compete due to the Olympic Committee's boycott of the 1980 Summer Olympics in Moscow, Russia. He was one of 461 athletes to receive a Congressional Gold Medal instead.

He later became an attorney specializing in insurance law. He was mayor of Pleasantville, New York,from 1995 to 2003. He became a member of the Westchester County Board of Legislators.

References

External links
 

1948 births
Living people
American male foil fencers
Olympic fencers of the United States
Fencers at the 1972 Summer Olympics
Sportspeople from New York City
Regis High School (New York City) alumni
Legislators from Westchester County, New York
People from Pleasantville, New York
Pan American Games medalists in fencing
Pan American Games silver medalists for the United States
Pan American Games bronze medalists for the United States
Congressional Gold Medal recipients
Fencers at the 1979 Pan American Games
American athlete-politicians